Andrija Zmajević (6 June 1628 - 7 September 1694) was a Baroque poet, the Archbishop of Antivari and a theologian.

Biography
The Zmajević family hailed from Vrba, a village from the region of the Njeguši tribe; when the last members of the Crnojević family left the Principality of Zeta, Nikola Zmajević and his cousins Ivaniš and Vučeta moved to Kotor, at the beginning of the 16th century. There, they quickly converted from Christian Orthodoxy in favor of Roman Catholicism, by marrying “Latin” women. Becoming appealed and somewhat wealthy, the family acquired property and gained a reputation and a name in Kotor.

Andrija Zmajević was born in Perast, in the Bay of Kotor, at the time part of the Republic of Venice, in late July 1628. His grandmother Anđuša had moved from Kotor to Perast in the early 17th century, after the death of her husband. After finishing the Fransiscan primary school in his native town, Andrija Zmajević continued his education in Kotor, before moving to the College for the Propagation of the Faith, in Rome, where he earned a doctorate of philosophy and theology. In 1656, back in Perast, he became the town's pastor and the abbot of the monastery of St. George, on the Sveti Đorđe Island. In 1664, he became the vicar of the bishopric of Budva, where he remained after being appointed as titular archbishop of Bar in 1671, as the latter city was under Ottoman rule.

Work
He collected epic and lyric folk songs and transcribed the works of Dubrovnik poets, notably Ivan Gundulić. His most important theological and historical work is Ljetopis Crkovni (“Church Chronicles”, written in 1675), and illustrated by himself and his countryman Tripo Kokolja. With the exception of the poem Od pakla, published in Venice in 1727, all his works remained in manuscript, some of which have been lost. Among the most notable are:

Ljetopis crkovni (“Church chronicles”)
Svadja Lazarevih kćeri, Brankovice i Miloševice (“The Quarrel of Lazar’s daughters, wife of Branko and wife of Miloš”)
Boj Peraški (“The Battle of Perast”); lost
Slovinskoj Dubravi (“Of Slavic Dubrovnik”)
Tripu Škuri (“Of Tripo Škura”)
Od pakla (“From Hell”); lost

Zmajević's 1675 Church Chronicle had recorded much secular history.

Zmajević wrote both in Cyrillic and in Latin scripts. Zmajević called the language in which he wrote "Slavic" (slovinski). He justified his decision to write in Cyrillic script since it was used by the "Illyrian" and overall Slavic world.

Zmajević saw all the South Slavs as the same people and hoped for the Orthodox Serbs to be united in the Roman faith. He praised Saint Sava, while incorrectly depicting him as faithful to Rome.

Legacy

The Croatian Encyclopedia describes him as a 'Croatian archbishop and writer' and notes that his few remaining works are archived by HAZU.

References

Sources 
 Prednjegoševsko doba, Titograd 1963.
 
 
 
 
 

Serbian Roman Catholic priests
1628 births
1694 deaths
Republic of Venice poets
People from Perast
Archbishops of Antivari
Serbian male poets
Montenegrin poets
Montenegrin male writers
Roman Catholic writers
Venetian period in the history of Montenegro
Venetian Slavs
17th-century Serbian writers
17th-century Roman Catholic archbishops in the Republic of Venice
Montenegrin Roman Catholic archbishops